Pseudolaguvia shawi is a species of catfish from waters in Darjeeling, Siliguri Terai and Sikkim in India.

Etymology
The fish is named in honor of naturalist G. E. Shaw, who collected the type specimen.

References

Ng, H.H. and M. Kottelat, 2005. Caelatoglanis zonatus, a new genus and species of the Erethistidae (Teleostei: Siluriformes) from Myanmar, with comments on the nomenclature of Laguvia and Hara species. Ichthyol. Explor. Freshwat. 16(1):13-22. 

Catfish of Asia
Fish of India
Taxa named by Sunder Lal Hora
Fish described in 1921
Erethistidae